Kerry Wilkinson (born 4 November 1980) is a British author and sports journalist born in Bath, Somerset. In 2018, his book Ten Birthdays won the Romantic Novelists' Association award for Young Adult Novel of the Year. Along with Marius Gabriel, he was the first man to win a RoNA Award in the organisation's 58-year history. He is also an International Thriller Writers Awards winner, with Close To You, for best ebook original.

Work
Kerry Wilkinson is an author who has had bestselling ebooks in the UK, Canada, Australia and South Africa.

In 2011, he became one of the United Kingdom's most-successful self-published authors, but has since worked with 'traditional' publishers. In the final quarter of 2011, Amazon UK announced he was their top-selling author for their Amazon Kindle chart - and that he had sold over 250,000 ebooks.

His first novel, Locked In, went to number one on the Amazon Kindle chart and Apple's iTunes crime books chart. At one point in November 2011, he had the top three books in the crime chart.

He signed a six-book deal with Pan Books in February 2012 to publish his Jessica Daniel series of novels.

In March 2012, it was announced he was one of Amazon's top-10 bestselling UK-born authors worldwide for 2011. In August 2012, it was reported he was one of Amazon's top-10 bestselling Kindle authors in 2012.

In September 2012, Pan Macmillan announced they had acquired a "fantasy trilogy for young adults", the Silver Blackthorn series.

The fourth Jessica Daniel book, Think of the Children, became Amazon UK's no.1 ebook pre-order, in February 2013, with the paperback peaking at number 19 on the UK chart.

In August 2013, The Bookseller reported that Pan Macmillan had bought two more books from Wilkinson, including a standalone crime novel, Down Among The Dead Men; and Something Wicked, a spin-off from Playing With Fire, book five of the Jessica Daniel series.

Watched: When Road Rage Follows You Home (Dec 2013) and Crossing The Line (January 2014) became Wilkinson's seventh and eighth successive novels to appear in Amazon's top 20 crime chart.

A further deal followed in 2014 for another book in the Jessica Daniel series, another Andrew Hunter book, and a standalone crime thriller entitled, No Place Like Home. In 2015, the Bookseller reported his sales were "fast approaching the one million mark".

With the Jessica Daniel series continuing through Pan Books in the UK, publisher Bookouture secured the rights to publish the series in the United States, as well as global rights for "two psychological thrillers".

In 2017, the first of those thrillers, Two Sisters, peaked at No.1 in the Canada Kindle chart and the iBooks chart. It also reached No.14 in the UK Kindle chart and No.20 in the United States.

The second, The Girl Who Came Back, reached No.1 in the UK Kobo chart and No.2 in the UK Kindle chart. It also became his second No.1 in Canada.

In 2018, his coming-of-age novel, Ten Birthdays, won Young Adult romance novel of the year at the Romantic Novelists' Association Awards.

In 2020, his novel, Close To You, won Best Ebook Original Novel at the International Thriller Writers Awards.

In 2021, publisher Bookouture announced Wilkinson's novel, The Blame, was his "30th book with us: the most titles Bookouture has ever released from one author". It also acquired "World All Languages rights for two more addictive psychological thrillers, plus the coming-of-age novel Truly, Madly, Amy"

In 2022, Bookouture said they had "signed a four-book mystery series with bestselling author Kerry Wilkinson".

Education
Kerry Wilkinson attended Oakfield Middle School and Frome Community College in Frome, Somerset. He has a degree in journalism from the University of Central Lancashire.

Bibliography
Miscellaneous
Official Handbook of the Marvel Universe: Spider-Man (2005) (co-writer)

Jessica Daniel crime novels
Locked In (2011),  (German version: Eingesperrt - Jessica Daniel ermittelt, Translator: Olaf Knechten, 2013) 
Vigilante (2011) 
The Woman In Black (2011) 
As If By Magic (ebook exclusive, 2012)
Think Of The Children (February 2013) 
Playing With Fire (July 2013) 
Thicker Than Water (October 2013) 
Behind Closed Doors (January 2014) 
Crossing The Line (September 2014) 
Scarred For Life (January 2015) 
For Richer, For Poorer (February 2016) 
Nothing But Trouble (February 2017) 
Eye For An Eye (January 2018) 
Silent Suspect (January 2019) 
The Unlucky Ones (July 2019) 
A Cry In The Night (January 2020) 

The Jessica Daniel novels are also available as audiobooks, read by Becky Hindley.

Andrew Hunter crime novels
Something Wicked (June 2014)
Something Hidden (June 2015)
Something Buried (February 2019)

Silver Blackthorn novels
Reckoning (May 2014)  (UK, Pan Books); (July 2014)  (USA, St. Martin's Press)
Renegade (May 2015)   (UK, Pan Books); (July 2015)  (USA, St. Martin's Press)
Resurgence (May 2016)  (UK, Pan Books); (July 2016)  (USA, St. Martin's Press)

Other crime novels
Watched: When Road Rage Follows You Home (2013)
Down Among The Dead Men (September 2015) 
No Place Like Home (November 2016) 
Two Sisters (June 2017) 
The Girl Who Came Back (September 2017) 
Last Night (March 2018) 
The Wife's Secret (October 2018) 
A Face In The Crowd (June 2019) 
Close To You (October 2019) 
After The Accident (March 2020) 
The Child Across The Street (July 2020) 
What My Husband Did (November 2020) 
The Blame (February 2021) 
The Child In The Photo (June 2021) 
The Perfect Daughter (September 2021) 
The Party At Number 12 (March 2022) 
The Boyfriend (June 2022)

Other novels
Ten Birthdays (April 2017) 
The Death And Life Of Eleanor Parker (July 2018) 
Truly, Madly, Amy (July 2022)

References

External links
KerryWilkinson.com his personal website including his blog and bibliography.

1980 births
21st-century English novelists
English crime fiction writers
English crime writers
English thriller writers
English mystery writers
Living people
People from Bath, Somerset
People from Frome
English male novelists
21st-century English male writers